Sudhir Uttamlal Mehta (born 1954) is an Indian billionaire businessman. Together with his brother, Samir, he operates Torrent Group, which was founded by their late father, U. N. Mehta in 1959. In September 2021, Sudhir and Samir Mehta's net worth was estimated at US$7.2 billion.

Early life 
Mehta was born to a Gujarati Jain family in 1954 and he received his bachelor's degree from Gujarat University.

Personal life 
Mehta has two sons, Jinal and Varun. Jinal Mehta is a director of Torrent Power.

References

1954 births
Indian billionaires
Living people
Gujarati people
Gujarat University alumni
Torrent Group
Indian Jains